Matafao Peak (Samoan: Fa’asi’usi’uga o Matafao) is a mountain in American Samoa, on the island of Tutuila. With an elevation of 653 meters (2,142 ft), it is the highest peak on Tutuila Island. The mountain, like Rainmaker Mountain across Pago Pago Harbor, is a remnant of a volcanic plug and is part of the volcanic origins of the island. The mountain can be hiked from the high point of the Pago Pago-to-Fagasa Road. It is designated a National Natural Landmark above the 492-foot level, an area known as Matafao Peak National Natural Landmark.

The name “Matafao” is said to refer to the fact that, from its peak, in fair weather, one can see as far as Mount Fao on Upolu Island.

See also
List of National Natural Landmarks in American Samoa

References

National Natural Landmarks in American Samoa
Mountains of American Samoa